La Luna (Italian and Spanish for "The Moon") is a 2011 American computer-animated short film, directed and written by Enrico Casarosa in his directorial debut. The short premiered on June 6, 2011 at the Annecy International Animated Film Festival in France, and it was paired with Pixar's Brave for its theatrical release on June 22, 2012, being shown before the film's beginning. La Luna was released on November 13, 2012, on the Brave DVD and Blu-ray, and on a new Pixar Short Films Collection, Volume 2, the second collection of Pixar's short films. La Luna was nominated for Best Animated Short Film at the 84th Academy Awards.

Plot
A young Italian boy, Bambino, goes on a midnight boat trip with his father Papà and grandfather Nonno in Genoa, Italy. After they anchor in the middle of the sea, Nonno presents Bambino with a cap similar to the ones he and Papà wear. The two men disagree on how Bambino should wear it, with Papà pulling it low over his eyes and Nonno pushing it back on his head.

Papà sets up a long ladder for Bambino to climb so he can set an anchor on the full moon, and the three ascend to start their work of sweeping fallen stars off the lunar surface. Papà urges Bambino to use a pushbroom on the stars, while Nonno favors a besom broom. As they quarrel, a huge star crashes on the moon; it is far too large for any of them to move.

Turning his cap backward, the way he wants to wear it, Bambino climbs onto the star and taps it with a hammer. It bursts apart into hundreds of smaller stars, and all three go to work sweeping them to one side, with Bambino choosing a rake instead of either man's broom. Once the job is done, they climb down to their boat and look up at the moon, which now displays a glowing crescent phase thanks to their efforts.

Production 
The plot was inspired by Casarosa's childhood and tales by Antoine de Saint-Exupéry and Italo Calvino. The style comes from Hayao Miyazaki's anime and from La Linea by the Italian cartoonist Osvaldo Cavandoli.

Voice cast
 Krista Sheffler as Bambino (Kid)
 Tony Fucile as Papà (Dad)
 Phil Sheridan as Nonno (Grandpa)

References

External links
 
 
 

2011 films
American comedy short films
2010s American animated films
2010s animated short films
2011 computer-animated films
Films directed by Enrico Casarosa
Films scored by Michael Giacchino
Pixar short films
Moon in film
Animated films without speech
2010s English-language films